Khanabad (also Romanized as Khānābād) is a village in Bizaki Rural District, Golbajar District, Chenaran County, Razavi Khorasan Province, Iran. At the 2006 census, its population was 85, in 20 families.

References 

Populated places in Chenaran County